The 27th Young Artist Awards ceremony, presented by the Young Artist Association, honored excellence of young performers under the age of 21 in the fields of film and television for the year 2005, and took place on March 25, 2006 at the Sportsmen's Lodge in Studio City, Los Angeles, California.

Established in 1978 by long-standing Hollywood Foreign Press Association member, Maureen Dragone, the Young Artist Association was the first organization to establish an awards ceremony specifically set to recognize and award the contributions of performers under the age of 21 in the fields of film, television, theater and music.

Categories
★ Bold indicates the winner in each category.

Best Performance in a Feature Film

Best Performance in a Feature Film - Leading Young Actor
★ Josh Hutcherson - Zathura: A Space Adventure - Columbia Pictures
Adam Butcher - Saint Ralph - Alliance Entertainment
Freddie Highmore - Charlie and the Chocolate Factory - Warner Bros.
Taylor Lautner - The Adventures of Sharkboy and Lavagirl in 3-D - Columbia Pictures
William Moseley - The Chronicles of Narnia: The Lion, the Witch and the Wardrobe - Walt Disney Pictures

Best Performance in a Feature Film - Leading Young Actress
★ Dakota Fanning - Dreamer - DreamWorks
Taylor Dooley - The Adventures of Sharkboy and Lavagirl in 3-D - Columbia Pictures
Jordan-Claire Green - Come Away Home - Haven Films
Q'Orianka Kilcher - The New World - New Line Cinema
AnnaSophia Robb - Because of Winn-Dixie - 20th Century Fox

Best Performance in a Feature Film - Supporting Young Actor
★ Ridge Canipe - Walk the Line - Universal Pictures
Josh Flitter - The Greatest Game Ever Played - Walt Disney Pictures
Michael Kanev - Saint Ralph - Alliance Atlantis
Owen Kline - The Squid and the Whale - American Empirical Pictures
Steven Anthony Lawrence - Kicking & Screaming - Universal Pictures
Steven Christopher Parker - Rebound - 20th Century Fox
Max Thieriot - The Pacifier - Walt Disney Pictures

Best Performance in a Feature Film - Supporting Young Actress
★ Suzuka Ohgo - Memoirs of a Geisha - Columbia Pictures
Aleisha Allen - Are We There Yet? - Columbia Pictures
Jenna Boyd - The Sisterhood of the Traveling Pants - Warner Bros.
Alisha Mullally - The 12 Dogs of Christmas - Kragen Productions

Best Performance in a Feature Film - Young Actor Age Ten or Younger
★ Adrian Alonso - The Legend of Zorro - Columbia Pictures
Jonah Bobo - Zathura: A Space Adventure - Columbia Pictures
Philip Bolden - Are We There Yet? - Columbia Pictures

Best Performance in a Feature Film - Young Actress Age Ten or Younger
★ Georgie Henley - The Chronicles of Narnia: The Lion, the Witch and the Wardrobe - Walt Disney Pictures
 Heidi Hayes - A History of Violence - New Line Cinema
Chloë Grace Moretz - The Amityville Horror - MGM
Aria Wallace - The Perfect Man - Universal Pictures

Best Performance in a Feature Film - Young Ensemble Cast
★ Bad News Bears - ParamountSeth Adkins, Ridge Canipe, Brandon Craggs, Jeffrey Davies, Timmy Deters, Carlos and Emmanuel Estrada, Troy Gentile, Kenneth "KC" Harris, Aman Johal, Carter Jenkins, Tyler Patrick Jones, Sammi Kane Kraft and Jeffrey TedmoriCheaper by the Dozen 2 - 20th Century Fox
Brent Kinsman, Shane Kinsman, Forrest Landis, Liliana Mumy, Piper Perabo, Kevin Schmidt, Jacob Smith, Alyson Stoner, Blake Woodruff and Morgan York
Your, Mine and Ours - Paramount
Drake Bell, Dean Collins, Miranda Cosgrove, Jennifer Habib, Jessica Habib, Miki Ishikawa, Lil' JJ, Tyler Patrick Jones, Brecken Palmer, Bridger Palmer, Danielle Panabaker, Ty Panitz, Slade Pearce, Haley Ramm, Nicholas Roget-King and Andrew Vo

Best Performance in an International Feature Film
Best Performance in an International Feature Film - Leading Young Performer
★ (tie) Marcos Henrique (Brazil) - 2 Filhos de Francisco - Globo Films★ (tie) Dablio Moreira (Brazil) - 2 Filhos de Francisco - Globo FilmsBarney Clark (England) - Oliver Twist - Runteam II Ltd.
Matteo Gadola (Italy) - Once You're Born You Can No Longer Hide - Aquarius Films
Hannah Lochner (England) - Child of Mine - Kudos Productions
Topi Majaniemi (Finland) - Äideistä parhain - Marila Rohr Productions

Best Performance in a Short Film
Best Performance in a Short Film - Young Actor
★ Evan Lee Dahl - Christopher Brennan Saves the World - Fresh Face PicturesCody Estes - See Anthony Run - Manpants Films
Austin Majors - Volare - Sky King Productions
Calum Worthy - When Jesse was Born - Ginger Pants Productions

Best Performance in a Short Film - Young Actress
★ Mary Ann Springer - Cleats of Imminent Doom - Curious ProductionsAnna Friedman - The Braggart - David Andalman Productions
Courtney Halverson - A Distant Shore - Franklin Rho Productions

Best Performance in a TV Movie, Miniseries or Special
Best Performance in a TV Movie, Miniseries or Special - Leading Young Actor
★ Michael Mitchell - Silver Bells - Hallmark ProductionsChristopher Plumley - The Metro Chase - Legend Family Films
Jeremy Sumpter - Cyber Seduction: His Secret Life - Lifetime

Best Performance in a TV Movie, Miniseries or Special - Leading Young Actress
★ Danielle Keaton - American Black Beauty - Fresh Water EntertainmentCourtney Jines - Silver Bells - Hallmark Productions
Alexa Vega - Odd Girl Out - Lifetime
Shailene Woodley - Felicity: An American Girl Adventure - WB

Best Performance in a TV Movie, Miniseries or Special - Supporting Young Actor
★ Hunter Clary - Snow Wonder - CBSJosh Hayden - Deck the Halls - USA Network
Jake Scott - Cyber Seduction: His Secret Life - Lifetime
Benjamin B. Smith - Bob the Butler - Disney Channel

Best Performance in a TV Movie, Miniseries or Special - Supporting Young Actress
★ Niamh Wilson - Haunting Sarah - LifetimeJasmine Berg - Lies My Mother Told Me - Lifetime
Katie Boland - The Man Who Lost Himself - Lifetime
Tessa Vonn - Buffalo Dreams - Disney Channel
Brittney Wilson - Chasing Christmas - ABC

Best Performance in a TV series
Best Performance in a TV series - Leading Young Actor (Comedy or Drama)
★ Carter Jenkins - Surface - NBCDylan and Cole Sprouse - The Suite Life of Zack & Cody - Disney Channel
Tyler James Williams - Everybody Hates Chris - UPN

Best Performance in a TV series - Leading Young Actress (Comedy or Drama)
★ Camille Winbush - The Bernie Mac Show - FOXAmy Bruckner - Phil of the Future - Disney Channel
Hallee Hirsh - Flight 29 Down - NBC

Best Performance in a TV series - Supporting Young Actor (Drama)
★ Malcolm David Kelley - Lost - ABCSpencer Achtymichuk - The Dead Zone USA Network
Eddie Hassell - Surface - NBC

Best Performance in a TV series - Supporting Young Actress (Drama)
★ Sofia Vassilieva - Medium - NBCConchita Campbell - The 4400 - USA
Vivien Cardone - Everwood - WB
Caitlin Wachs - Commander in Chief - ABC

Best Performance in a TV series - Supporting Young Actor (Comedy)
★ Angus T. Jones - Two and a Half Men - CBSOliver Davis - Rodney - ABC
Joel Homan - Yes, Dear - CBS
Paulie Litt - Hope and Faith - ABC
Vincent Martella - Everybody Hates Chris - UPN

Best Performance in a TV series - Supporting Young Actress (Comedy)
★ Renee Olstead - Still Standing - CBSMacey Cruthird - Hope and Faith - ABC
Joy Lauren - Desperate Housewives - ABC

Best Performance in a TV series - Young Actor Age Ten or Younger (Comedy or Drama)
★ Noah Gray-Cabey - My Wife and Kids - ABCAllen Alvarado - Flight 29 Down - NBC
Connor and Garret Sullivan - According to Jim - ABC
Drake Johnston - 7th Heaven - WB

Best Performance in a TV series - Young Actress Age Ten or Younger (Comedy or Drama)
★ Jasmine Jessica Anthony - Commander in Chief - ABCTaylor Atelian - According to Jim - ABC
Billi Bruno - According to Jim - ABC
Ariel Gade - Invasion - ABC
Maria Lark - Medium - NBC
Jazz Raycole - My Wife and Kids - ABC

Best Performance in a TV series - Guest Starring Young Actor (Comedy or Drama)
★ Joseph Castanon - The Ghost Whisperer - CBSSeth Adkins - The West Wing - NBC
Reed Alexander - Will & Grace - NBC 
Alex Black - Ned's Declassified School Survival Guide - Nickelodeon
Cole Heppell - The Dead Zone - USA Network
Masam Holden - Without a Trace - CBS
Cameron Monaghan - Ned's Declassified School Survival Guide - Nickelodeon
Tanner Richie - Nip/Tuck - FX
Cole Evan Weiss - Close to Home - CBS

Best Performance in a TV series - Guest Starring Young Actress (Comedy or Drama)
★ Darcy Rose Byrnes - The Young and the Restless - CBSCourtney Hope - Related - WB
Kali Majors - Strong Medicine - Lifetime
Cherrelle Noyd - Judging Amy - CBS
Ashley Rose Orr - Without a Trace - CBS
Jennifer Stone - House M.D. - FOX

Best Young Ensemble Performance in a TV Series (Comedy or Drama)
★ Zoey 101 - NickelodeonSean Flynn Amir, Paul Butcher, Kristin Herrera, Victoria Justice, Christopher Massey, Alexa Nikolas, Erin Sanders, Jamie Lynn Spears and Matthew UnderwoodDarcy's Wild Life - Discovery Kids
Andrew Chalmers, Shannon Collis, Demetrius Joyette, Melanie Leishman, Sara Paxton and Kerry Michael Saxena
Degrassi: The Next Generation - CTV
Dalmar Abuzeid, Sarah Barrable-Tishauer, John Bregar, Deanna Casaluce, Daniel Clark, Lauren Collins, Ryan Cooley, Marc Donato, Jake Epstein, Stacey Farber, Aubrey Graham, Jake Goldsbie, Shenae Grimes, Jamie Johnston, Shane Kippel, Andrea Lewis, Mike Lobel, Miriam McDonald, Melissa McIntyre, Daniel Morrison, Adamo Ruggiero and Cassie Steele
Life with Derek - Disney Channel
Ashley Leggat, Daniel Magder, Michael Seater, Jordan Todosey and Ariel Waller
Unfabulous - Nickelodeon
Jordan Calloway, Bianca Collins, Emma Degerstedt, Dustin Ingram, Malese Jow, Carter Jenkins, Emma Roberts, Brandon Smith and Chelsea Tavares

Best Performance in a Voice-Over Role
Best Performance in a Voice-Over Role - Young Actor
★ Matthew Josten - Chicken Little - Walt Disney PicturesJake T. Austin - Go, Diego, Go! - Nickelodeon
Marc Donato - Pom Poko - Disney Home Entertainment

Best Performance in a Voice-Over Role - Young Actress
★ Tajja Isen - Atomic Betty - Cartoon NetworkSarah Heinke - Strawberry Shortcake - Dic Entertainment
Brenda Grate - Tarzan II - Walt Disney Animation

Best Family Entertainment
Best Family Television Movie or Special
★ Silver Bells - HallmarkFelicity: An American Girl Adventure - WB
Go Figure - Disney Channel
Pope John Paul II - CBS
Riding the Bus with My Sister - Hallmark

Best Family Television Series (Drama)
★ Surface - NBCFlight 29 Down - NBC
Strong Medicine - Lifetime
Sue Thomas: FB Eye - KPXN

Best Family Television Series (Comedy)
★ Everybody Hates Chris - UPNAccording to Jim - ABC
Hope & Faith - ABC
Rodney - ABC
That's So Raven - Disney Channel

Best International Family Feature Film
★ Saint Ralph - CanadaÄideistä parhain (Mother of Mine) - Finland
Mrs. Palfrey at the Claremont - England
Oliver Twist - England
Once You're Born You Can No Longer Hide - Italy
2 Filhos de Francisco (Two Sons of Francisco) - Brazil

Best Family Feature Film - Animation
★ Wallace & Gromit: The Curse of the Were-Rabbit - DreamWorks/AardmanHowl's Moving Castle - Buena Vista Pictures
Pooh's Heffalump Movie - Walt Disney Pictures
Robots - 20th Century Fox
Tim Burton's Corpse Bride - Warner Bros.
Valiant - Vanguard Animation

Best Family Feature Film - Comedy or Musical
★ Charlie and the Chocolate Factory - Warner Bros.Because of Winn-Dixie - 20th Century Fox
Bewitched - Columbia Pictures
Rebound - 20th Century Fox
Sky High - Walt Disney Pictures
Yours, Mine and Ours - Paramount/MGM/Nickelodeon/Columbia

Best Family Feature Film - Drama
★ The Chronicles of Narnia: The Lion, the Witch and the Wardrobe - Walt Disney PicturesCinderella Man - Universal
Dreamer: Inspired by a True Story - DreamWorks
Finding Home - Castle Hill Productions
Legend of Zorro - Columbia Pictures
Memoirs of a Geisha - Universal
The Sisterhood of the Traveling Pants - Warner Bros.

Special awards
Outstanding Young Family Singing Group
★ The Von Trapp ChildrenMichael Landon Award
Outstanding Contribution to Youth in Entertainment
★ Hunter GomezOutstanding Young Musician
★ Andrew Tang - Concert PianistFormer Child Star - Life Achievement Award
★ Victoria Paige MeyerinkSocial Relations of Knowledge Institute Award
★ MythBusters - Discovery ChannelJackie Coogan Award
Outstanding Family Feature Documentary
★ March of the Penguins

Jackie Coogan Award

Outstanding Youth Feature Documentary
★ Mad Hot Ballroom

Best Original Song
★ Tony Renis - "Christmas in Love"

Outstanding International Drama
★ The Wedding Chest - Producer: Yevgeniya Tirdatova

References

External links
 Official site

Young Artist Awards ceremonies
2005 film awards
2005 television awards
2006 in California
2006 in American cinema
2006 in American television